The 2010 World Junior Wrestling Championships were the 33rd edition of the World Junior Wrestling Championships and were held in Budapest, Hungary between 19 and 25 July 2010.

Medal table

Medal summary

Men's freestyle

Greco-Roman

Women's freestyle

References

External links 
 Database

World Junior Championships
Wrestling Championships
International wrestling competitions hosted by Hungary
Sport in Hungary
Wrestling in Hungary
World Junior Wrestling Championships
Sports competitions in Budapest